Ģirts is a Latvian masculine given name and may refer to:
Ģirts Ankipāns (born 1975), Latvian ice hockey player
Ģirts Dzelde (born 1963), Latvian professional tennis player
Ģirts Feldbergs (born 1993), Latvian swimmer 
Ģirts Karlsons (born 1981), Latvian football striker
Ģirts Ķesteris (born 1964), Latvian actor
Ģirts Valdis Kristovskis (born 1962), Latvian politician
Ģirts Līcis (born 1970), Latvian entrepreneur and television presenter

Latvian masculine given names